Scaptia auriflua, the flower-feeding march fly, is a species of horse flies that occurs in Australia. Unlike other march flies this species does not bite and does not feed on blood, it strictly drinks nectar.

Description
Their eyes meet in the middle and the eye coloration differs from light source to light source.

References

Insects of Australia
Diptera of Australasia
Tabanidae
Insects described in 1805